Geoff Tisdale (born February 21, 1986) is a professional Canadian football defensive back. He last played for the Saskatchewan Roughriders of the Canadian Football League until being released on August 15, 2015. He was signed by the Hamilton Tiger-Cats as a street free agent in 2008. He played college football for the Pittsburg State Gorillas. On February 16, 2011, Tisdale was signed by the Calgary Stampeders as a free agent. On June 24, 2012, Tisdale was traded to the Hamilton Tiger-Cats for Hamilton's third-round and sixth-round draft picks in 2014.

References

External links
Montreal Alouettes bio

1986 births
Living people
American players of Canadian football
Calgary Stampeders players
Canadian football defensive backs
Pittsburg State Gorillas football players
Players of American football from Los Angeles
Players of Canadian football from Los Angeles